Pasquale Anselmo (born 14 April 1958) is an Italian actor and voice actor.

Biography
Born in Cosenza, Anselmo attended the Silvio D'Amico National Academy of Dramatic Arts and made light appearances on stage, film and television. He is better known as a voice dubber and he is the official Italian voice of Nicolas Cage. Other actors dubbed by Anselmo include John Turturro, David Koechner, Philip Seymour Hoffman, John Ortiz, Woody Harrelson, Clark Gregg and more.

Some of Anselmo's popular dubbing roles include Phil Coulson (portrayed by Clark Gregg) in the Marvel Cinematic Universe, Jimmy McGill (portrayed by Bob Odenkirk) in Better Call Saul and Vic Mackey (portrayed by Michael Chiklis) in The Shield. In Anselmo's animated roles, he took over as the Italian voice of Waylon Smithers in The Simpsons since the death of Vittorio Amandola in 2010. He also dubbed Rico in the Madagascar franchise and Pepé the King Prawn in The Muppets since 2005.

Filmography

Cinema
Il turista (1985)
Exit (1985)
The Mass Is Ended (1985)
Down There in the Jungle (1988)
Condominio (1991)
Crack (1991)
Another Life (1992)
No Skin (1994)
Palermo - Milan One Way (1995)
Facciamo fiesta (1997)
Le giraffe (2000)
The Comeback (2001)
Caterina in the Big City (2003)

Television
Uomo contro uomo (1989)
La buona battaglia – Don Pietro Pappagallo (2006)
Era mio fratello (2008)

Dubbing roles

Animation
Waylon Smithers in The Simpsons (season 21+)
Rico in Madagascar, Madagascar: Escape 2 Africa, Madagascar 3: Europe's Most Wanted, The Penguins of Madagascar
Vinny Santorini in Atlantis: The Lost Empire (both Italian and Latin Spanish dubs), Atlantis: Milo's Return
Bobby Goodfeather in Animaniacs
Dr. Tenma in Astro Boy
Peter Parker / Spider-Man Noir in Spider-Man: Into the Spider-Verse
Clark Kent / Superman in Teen Titans Go! To the Movies
Rumpelstiltskin in Happily N'Ever After
Pepé the King Prawn in The Muppets' Wizard of Oz, The Muppets, Muppets Most Wanted
Bernie Kropp in The Incredibles
Tybalt in Gnomeo & Juliet
Shmuel Frenkel in Waltz with Bashir
Hondo Ohnaka in Star Wars: The Clone Wars, Star Wars Rebels
Ichy in The Land Before Time IV: Journey Through the Mists
Anchor in Finding Nemo
Rudder in Finding Dory
Carmine in The Wild
Douche in Sausage Party
Owen Garrison in Scooby-Doo! Mask of the Blue Falcon
Moreno in Zarafa
Skua Boss in Happy Feet, Happy Feet Two
Kirby O'Neil in Teenage Mutant Ninja Turtles
Oscar Proud in The Proud Family, The Proud Family Movie
Vinny in Family Guy (season 12)
Red Alert in Transformers: Armada
Burt in Scooby-Doo! Camp Scare
Igg in Barnyard
Reggie in Racing Stripes
Amon in The Legend of Korra
Eddy's brother in Ed, Edd n Eddy's Big Picture Show
Sancho Panza in Donkey Xote
Ben in ChalkZone

Live action
Stanley Goodspeed in The Rock
Cameron Poe in Con Air
Castor Troy in Face/Off
Rick Santoro in Snake Eyes
Frank Pierce in Bringing Out the Dead
Jack Campbell in The Family Man
Antonio Corelli in Captain Corelli's Mandolin
Randall "Memphis" Raines in Gone in 60 Seconds
Acid Yellow in Sonny
Joe Enders in Windtalkers
Roy Walker in Matchstick Men
Ben Gates in National Treasure, National Treasure: Book of Secrets
Yuri Orlov in Lord of War
David Spritz in The Weather Man
John McLoughlin in World Trade Center
Edward Malus in The Wicker Man
Cris Johnson in Next
John Koestler in Knowing
Terence McDonagh in Bad Lieutenant: Port of Call New Orleans
Joe in Bangkok Dangerous
Balthazar Blake in The Sorcerer's Apprentice
John Milton in Drive Angry
Behmen von Bleibruck in Season of the Witch
Will Gerard in Seeking Justice
Kyle Miller in Trespass
Johnny Blaze / Ghost Rider in Ghost Rider: Spirit of Vengeance
Will Montgomery in Stolen
Jack Halcombe in The Frozen Ground
Joe Ransom in Joe
Evan Lake in Dying of the Light
Rayford Steele in Left Behind
Mike Lawford in Pay the Ghost
Hank Forrester in Snowden
Jim Stone in The Trust
Troy in Dog Eat Dog
Charles B. McVay III in USS Indianapolis: Men of Courage
Brian in Inconceivable
Mike Chandler in 211
Red Miller in Mandy
Al Fountain in Box of Moonlight
Joey Knish in Rounders
Dante Dominio in The Man Who Cried
Jesus Quintana in The Big Lebowski, The Jesus Rolls
John Stone in The Night Of
Joel Milner in Grace of My Heart
Crocker Johnson in Company Man
Ray Brocco in The Good Shepherd
Jim in Margot at the Wedding
Dick Bell in What Just Happened
Abner Doubleday in The Ridiculous 6
Arthur "Bird" Capezio in God's Pocket
Arnold in Gloria Bell
Dusty Davis in Twister
Freddie Miles in The Talented Mr. Ripley
Dan Mahowny in Owning Mahowny
Reverend Veasey in Cold Mountain
Jon Savage in The Savages
Father Brendan Flynn in Doubt
Paul Zara in The Ides of March
Plutarch Heavensbee in The Hunger Games: Catching Fire, The Hunger Games: Mockingjay – Part 1, The Hunger Games: Mockingjay – Part 2
Eddie Morales in Aliens vs. Predator: Requiem
Reuben Santiago in Pride and Glory
Phil D'Andrea in Public Enemies
Evandro Torres in The Drop
Moises Beltran in Peppermint
Phil Coulson in Iron Man, Iron Man 2, Thor, The Avengers, Captain Marvel, Agents of S.H.I.E.L.D.
Gerald in Labor Day
Paul in Spinning Man
Champ Kind in Anchorman: The Legend of Ron Burgundy, Anchorman 2: The Legend Continues
Bobby Jay Bliss in Thank You for Smoking
Lambeau Fields in The Comebacks
Ray Pekurny in EDtv
Bill White in North Country
Tobias Beckett in Solo: A Star Wars Story
Cletus Kasady in Venom
Tallahassee in Zombieland: Double Tap
Carlos Oliveira in Resident Evil: Apocalypse, Resident Evil: Extinction, Resident Evil: Retribution
William James in The Hurt Locker
Vic Mackey in The Shield
Vincent Savino in Vegas
Jimmy McGill in Better Call Saul
Earl Hickey in My Name Is Earl
Dwight Hendricks in Memphis Beat
Darrell Grant in Striptease
Todd Nixon in The Men Who Stare at Goats
Vince in Trouble with the Curve
Skiptracer in Identity Thief
John Boreman in Lovelace
Harry Elliot in Endless Love
Handsome Rob in The Italian Job
Quentin Conners in Chaos
John Crawford in War
Farmer in In the Name of the King
Terry Leather in The Bank Job
Phil Broker in Homefront
Sam Clayton in Feeling Minnesota
Holland Dale "Pooh-Bear" Monty in The Salton Sea
London in In Dubious Battle

References

External links
 
 
 

1958 births
Living people
Accademia Nazionale di Arte Drammatica Silvio D'Amico alumni
Italian male film actors
Italian male stage actors
Italian male television actors
Italian male voice actors
People from Cosenza
20th-century Italian male actors
21st-century Italian male actors